Spooners Cove, formerly Spooner's Cove, and Buchon Cove, is a bay in San Luis Obispo County, California. Islay Creek has its mouth at this cove.

History
Spooners Cove is named for Alden B. Spooner II who first settled above the cove (then named Buchon Cove) with his family in 1892.

References

Bodies of water of San Luis Obispo County, California